Operation Dawn 7 (Operation Walfajr-7; Persian: عملیات والفجر 7) is the name of an operation during Iran–Iraq War which was stopped before its practical beginning due to the specific conditions of the region/war, such as: releasing water at the region by the Iraqi forces, etc. 

The (military) code of the operation was "Ya Zahra" (یازهرا); and the considered operational areas were consisted of Chazabeh which was located in the distance of 110 km to the north west of Ahwaz and Chilat (Dehloran). (At the area of Zeid and Kooshk, where was located at the geographical location of --the north of-- Hosseinieh station.)

Eventually, the determined operation which was planned to be done after the Operation Dawn-6, finally finished before beginning (as a specific situation and operation). Operation Dawn-7 went to the next step to perform the next operation --namely "Operation Dawn 8" (Operation Walfajr-8) on 9 February 1986 on the south fronts, located in Abadan (Faw).

See also
 Operation Dawn-6
 Operation Dawn-8

References

Iran–Iraq War
Battles involving Iran
Battles involving Iraq